Borský Mikuláš (or) is a large village and municipality in Senica District in the Trnava Region of western Slovakia.

History 
In historical records the village was first mentioned in 1394.

Geography 
The municipality lies at an altitude of 198 metres and covers an area of 49.982 km². It has a population of about 3,879 people.

People 
 Fridrich Weinwurm
Ján Hollý

Genealogical resources

The records for genealogical research are available at the state archive "Statny 
Archiv in Bratislava, Slovakia"

 Roman Catholic church records (births/marriages/deaths): 1660-1898 (parish A)

See also
 List of municipalities and towns in Slovakia

References

External links 

 Official page
Surnames of living people in Borsky Mikulas

Villages and municipalities in Senica District